Ballophilus giganteus is a species of centipede in the genus Ballophilus. It is found in Ivory Coast.

References 

Ballophilidae
Animals described in 1963